Lomer is a given name and surname. It can refer to:

People
George Lomer (1904 – 1966), Australian rules footballer
Kathryn Lomer (born 1958), Australian novelist
Lomer Brisson (1916 – 1981), Canadian politician and lawyer
Lomer Gouin (1861 – 1929), Canadian politician, premier of Quebec
Lomer (saint) (died 593), Christian saint

Places
Saint-Lomer, a former village now part of Courtomer, Orne
Lomer (village), a village in Hampshire depopulated by the Black Death

Other
Lomer–Cottrell junction. In materials science, a particular configuration of dislocations